Enno Poppe (born 30 December 1969 in Hemer, North Rhine-Westphalia) is a German composer and conductor of classical music, and an academic teacher.

Career 
Enno Poppe studied composition and conducting at the Hochschule der Künste Berlin with Friedrich Goldmann and Gösta Neuwirth, among others. He studied sound synthesis and algorithmic composition with Heinrich Taube at the Zentrum für Kunst und Medientechnologie in Karlsruhe.

Since 1998 he has conducted the ensemble mosaik for contemporary music in Berlin. He taught from 2002 to 2004 at the Hochschule für Musik "Hanns Eisler". He received commissions from Salzburg Festival, Berliner Festwochen, Ensemble InterContemporain, The Louvre, Junge Deutsche Philharmonie, Ensemble Modern, Klangforum Wien, the Westdeutscher Rundfunk, the SWR for the Donaueschinger Musiktage and the Bayerischer Rundfunk.

Poppe was a Stipendiat of the Villa Massimo in 1995/96, and won an Ernst von Siemens Composers' Prize in 2004.

His opera Arbeit Nahrung Wohnung (Work, Nourishment, Lodging) on a libretto of Marcel Beyer was premiered at the Munich Biennale in 2008.

Since 2008 Poppe has been a member of the Academy of Arts, Berlin, since 2009 of the Nordrhein-Westfälische Akademie der Wissenschaften und der Künste and, since 2010, of the Bayerische Akademie der Schönen Künste.

Works

Stage works 
 IQ (2011–2012). Text: Marcel Beyer
 Arbeit Nahrung Wohnung (2006–2007). Text: Marcel Beyer
 Interzone (2003–2004) Text: Marcel Beyer

Works for orchestra 
 Schnur (2019)
 Fett (2018–2019) 
 Welt (2011–2012) 
 Markt (2008–2009) 
 Altbau (2007–2008)
 Keilschrift (2006)
 Obst (2006)

Works for ensemble 
 O Du (2020) for ensemble
 Prozession (2015–2020) for large ensemble
 Rundfunk (2015–2018) for 9 synthesizers
 Fleisch  (2017) for tenor saxophone, electric guitar, keyboard and percussion
 Filz (2014) for viola solo, 4 clarinets and strings
 Speicher (2008–2013)
 Wald (2010) for four string quartets 
 Salz (2005) 
 Öl (2001–2004) 
 Holz (1999–2000) for clarinet and small ensemble
 Dem Bones (1999–2000) for ensemble

Chamber music 
 Quintet (2016/2020) for string quintet
 Buch (2013–2016) for string quartet
 Freizeit (2016) for string quartet
 Feld (2007/2017) for two pianos and two percussionists
 Brot (2007/2013) for five instruments
 Schweiß (2010) for violoncello and keyboard or for four instruments
 Tonband (2008/2012) for two keyboards, percussion and live electronics
 Zug (2008) for seven brass players
 Rad (2003) for two keyboards
 Tier (2002) for string quartet
 Gelöschte Lieder (1996–1999) flute, violin, violoncello and piano

Vocal music 
 Augen (2020–2022) for soprano and chamber orchestra. Text: Else Lasker-Schüler
 Der Wechsel menschlicher Sachen (2020) for mixed choir. Text: Quirinus Kuhlmann
 Ich kann mich an nichts erinnern (2005–2015) for choir, organ and orchestra. Text: Marcel Beyer
 Abend (2007) for four male voices and four trombones 
 Drei Arbeiten (2007) for baritone, horn, piano and percussion 
 Gold (2006) for mixed choir 
 Wespe (2005) for voice solo

Solo music 
 Fell (2016) for drumset solo
 Haare (2014) for violin
 Zwölf (2014) for violoncello 
 17 Etüden für die Flöte, 3. Heft (1993/2009)
 Arbeit (2006–2007) for virtual Hammond organ
 Herz (2002) for violoncello
 Holz solo (1999/2004–2015) for bassoon or bass clarinet
 Thema mit 840 Variationen (1993/1997) for piano
 17 Etüden für die Violine, 2. Heft (1993)

References

External links 
 Enno Poppe, at Ricordi
 Enno Poppe, at SWR
 Enno Poppe platformaproject.ru 

1969 births
Living people
People from Hemer
German opera composers
Male opera composers
German male conductors (music)
20th-century classical composers
21st-century classical composers
Berlin University of the Arts alumni
Members of the Academy of Arts, Berlin
Pupils of Friedrich Goldmann
German male classical composers
20th-century German composers
Ernst von Siemens Composers' Prize winners
String quartet composers
21st-century German composers
20th-century German conductors (music)
21st-century German conductors (music)
20th-century German male musicians
21st-century German male musicians